Monmouth Park is a seasonal NJ Transit commuter rail station on the North Jersey Coast Line, located in Oceanport, New Jersey, and serving the current Monmouth Park Racetrack.  The first two locations of Monmouth Park were inside now-closed Fort Monmouth.  Both those locations had dedicated rail sidings owned by The Monmouth Park Railroad.

Railway service to the current Monmouth Park began in 1946. There were two stations: a diesel-only terminal station, and an electric-compatible station. The diesel-only stop was where the special Pony Express service terminated, until the end of the 2005 racing season.  That terminal station was located inside the racetrack's property accessed by a dedicated siding off of the current NJ Transit rail line.   That service was discontinued afterwards and so this area is no longer used as a train station (since filled over). During the 2007 Breeders Cup, the area where the single-track station is located served as a hospitality center/entrance.

This station is served at least once an hour from approximately 10:30 a.m. until approximately 7 p.m. on Fridays and race days during the racing season.


Station layout
The station has two low-level gravel surfaced side platforms serving trains in both directions. The northbound platform features bus shelter style protection from the elements along with some benches. The southbound platform features just benches. There are no ticket machines at this station.

References

External links

 Station from Port Au Peck Avenue from Google Maps Street View

Railway stations in Monmouth County, New Jersey
NJ Transit Rail Operations stations
Stations on the North Jersey Coast Line
Former New York and Long Branch Railroad stations